David Goodwin (born 15 October 1954) is an English former footballer who played in the Football League for Bury, Crewe Alexandra, Mansfield Town, Rochdale, and Stoke City.

Career
Goodwin was born in Nantwich and began his career with Stoke City where he made an impressive start scoring on his debut in a 2–0 home win over West Ham United at the start of the 1973–74 season. He played six more times for the "Potters" that season scoring in another 2–0 win at home to Norwich City. He spent the summer of 1974 playing in the United States with Miami Toros. He returned to the Victoria Ground in 1975–76 playing in four matches and then spent time out on loan at Workington playing seven times for the Borough Park side failing to find the net. He returned to Stoke and played in 13 matches in 1976–77 scoring in a 1–0 win away at Ipswich Town as Stoke were relegated at the end of the season. After failing to establish himself in George Eastham's side he was sold to Mansfield Town.

With the "Stags" Goodwin played 60 times scoring eight goals in three seasons with saw Mansfield be relegated from the Second Division to Fourth. He then had one season spells with Bury, Rochdale and Crewe Alexandra ending his career with non-league Macclesfield.

Career statistics
Source:

A.  The "Other" column constitutes appearances and goals in the Anglo-Scottish Cup, Texaco Cup.

References

English footballers
Stoke City F.C. players
Mansfield Town F.C. players
Bury F.C. players
Rochdale A.F.C. players
Crewe Alexandra F.C. players
Macclesfield Town F.C. players
English Football League players
North American Soccer League (1968–1984) players
Miami Toros players
People from Nantwich
1954 births
Living people
Association football forwards
English expatriate sportspeople in the United States
Expatriate soccer players in the United States
English expatriate footballers